True North is a 1996 historical novel for young adults by Kathryn Lasky, and published by Scholastic Corporation. Set in 1850s America, it is a story about the Underground Railroad. Afrika, a slave girl from Virginia, and Lucy, an independent girl constricted by Boston society, take different paths in life, Lucy exploring her family's history, and Afrika desperately searching for freedom, narrowly escaping capture.

External links
True North Discussion Guide 

1996 American novels
Novels set in the 1850s
American historical novels
Novels about American slavery
American young adult novels
Novels by Kathryn Lasky
Novels set in Boston
Works about the Underground Railroad